Sergio Jordan Chavez (born February 28, 1997) is an American soccer player who plays as a defender for USL League One club Central Valley Fuego.

Early years
Born in San Diego, Chavez grew up in nearby Chula Vista and attended Mater Dei Catholic High School, where he was a three-time first-team all-league performer for the Crusaders. At the club level, he played for Albion SC.

He played college soccer for the UNLV Rebels from 2015 to 2018, playing 74 games and starting 67. He scored his first goal during his freshman season, an outside-the-box strike during their 3–2 win over his hometown SDSU Aztecs in San Diego.

Club career
After graduating from college he returned home and spent time with local semi-pro side Chula Vista FC, where he was spotted by San Diego Loyal manager Landon Donovan and his staff. He signed with the Loyal in the summer of 2020 during the league suspension due to the COVID-19 pandemic. He and fellow Chula Vista native Austin Guerrero joined the team just prior to the return to play, and he was able to give the news of his first pro contract to his dad on Father's Day. He was first called up to a matchday squad on August 1, but remained an unused substitute during their scoreless draw against Sacramento Republic FC. He remained unused throughout the rest of the regular season as the Loyal failed to qualify for the playoffs.

It was announced Chavez would return to the team for the 2021 season. "He has grown tremendously over the course of the past year and his future is extremely bright. He embodies all of our values and we look forward to his continued development," said Donovan of his progress. He made his professional debut on May 13, coming on for Hunter Ashworth during their 3–1 loss to Tacoma Defiance. Chavez earned his first start three months later at centre back during a 2–1 home defeat to Orange County SC.

On February 15, 2022, Chavez was signed by USL League One club Central Valley Fuego.

References

External links
 
 UNLV Rebels bio
 San Diego Loyal bio

Living people
1997 births
American soccer players
Association football defenders
UNLV Rebels men's soccer players
San Diego Loyal SC players
Central Valley Fuego FC players
Soccer players from San Diego
Sportspeople from Chula Vista, California
American sportspeople of Mexican descent
USL Championship players
USL League One players